The 2004 Time Warner Cable Road Runner 250 was the third round of the 2004 Bridgestone Presents the Champ Car World Series Powered by Ford season, held on June 5, 2004 at the Milwaukee Mile in West Allis, Wisconsin. The relatively cold temperatures for the night race limited passing, allowing Ryan Hunter-Reay to lead every lap of the race from the pole.

Qualifying results

Race

Caution flags

Notes

 New Race Record Ryan Hunter-Reay 1:59:12.397
 Average Speed 129.859 mph

Championship standings after the race

Drivers' Championship standings

 Note: Only the top five positions are included.

External links
 Full Weekend Times & Results
 Qualifying Results
 Race Box Score

References

Milwaukee
Milwaukee Indy 225